Ysbyty Bron y Garth (English: Bron y Garth Hospital) was a health facility in Penrhyndeudraeth, Gwynedd, Wales. It was managed by the Betsi Cadwaladr University Health Board.

History
The facility has its origins in the Ffestiniog Union Workhouse which opened in 1839. It became the Ffestiniog Public Assistance Institution in 1930 and joined the National Health Service as Bron y Garth Hospital in 1948. After services transferred to Ysbyty Alltwen, Ysbyty Bron y Garth closed in 2009.

References

Hospitals in Gwynedd
Hospitals established in 1839
1839 establishments in Wales
Hospital buildings completed in 1839
Defunct hospitals in Wales